Eugen Sigg-Bächthold (16 January 1898–29 December 1994), better known as Eugen Sigg, was a Swiss rower who competed in the 1924 Summer Olympics. In 1924, he won the gold medal with the Swiss boat in the coxed four event. He was also part of the Swiss boat which won the bronze medal in the coxless four competition.

References

External links
 Database Olympics Profile

1898 births
1994 deaths
Swiss male rowers
Olympic bronze medalists for Switzerland
Olympic gold medalists for Switzerland
Olympic rowers of Switzerland
Rowers at the 1924 Summer Olympics
Olympic medalists in rowing
Medalists at the 1924 Summer Olympics
European Rowing Championships medalists